Precious Fathers is a Canadian instrumental post-rock shoegazer ensemble,/ based in Vancouver, British Columbia. Its members are linked to other projects, including Destroyer, Loscil, Sparrow and The Battles. Their music combines pulsating rhythms with multiple guitar effects and dynamic volume shifts.

History
Guitarists Tim Loewen and Jaret Penner, along with drummer Josh Lindstrom and Paul Goertzen, founded Precious Fathers.  In 2005, the band released their self-titled first album through the White Whale label.  The album received some airplay on campus and community radio stations. The band performed that year in Toronto.

Precious Fathers' second album, Alluvial Fan, was released in 2009, and was streamed online. In June the album appeared on !earshot's community and campus radio Top 50 Chart. That year the band performed locally in Vancouver.

Discography

Albums
2005 Precious Fathers
2009 Alluvial Fan

References

External links
Precious Fathers official website
Precious Fathers at MySpace

Musical groups with year of establishment missing
Musical groups from Vancouver
Canadian post-rock groups